Between Us is a 2012 American drama film directed by Dan Mirvish, based on the play by Joe Hortua, with a screenplay adaptation by Hortua and Mirvish. It stars Taye Diggs, Melissa George, David Harbour, and Julia Stiles.

Cast
Taye Diggs as Carlo
Melissa George as Sharyl
David Harbour as Joel
Julia Stiles as Grace
Mara New as Bridesmaid
Julia Cho as Guest
Claudio Dabed as The Brazilian

Release

The film had its world premiere at the Oldenburg International Film Festival. monterey media inc. acquired all U.S. and Canadian rights to the film in April 2013 and plans on a summer theatrical release.  The US theatrical began on June 21, 2013 in Los Angeles at the Downtown Independent Theater.  The US theatrical began on June 21, 2013 in Los Angeles at the Downtown Independent Theater.

Festivals

'Between Us' won the grand jury prize at the 2012 Bahamas International Film Festival, and was the Closing Night Film at the 50th Annual Gijón International Film Festival in Spain.

'Between Us' was selected to screen at the following film festivals:

2012 Bahamas International Film Festival
2012 Hamptons International Film Festival
2012 Slamdance Film Festival
2012 Whistler Film Festival.
2012 Atlanta Film Festival
2012 Ashland Independent Film Festival
2012 Indie Memphis Film Festival 
2013 Dallas International Film Festival
2013 Sarasota Film Festival

Reception

Richard Rushfield of BuzzFeed described the film as "a powerful, brilliantly acted character piece about two couples who meet over the course of several years to serially rip out the loose threads of their relationships. The four-person cast of Julia Stiles, Taye Diggs, Melissa George, and David Harbour (Elliot of The Newsroom) give the sense of breathing in their parts so deeply that they are at every move haunted by their characters' secrets and torn by rival pulls of love and contempt toward the other characters.  No corner of intimacy or secrets is left unexposed in the film that is at once hilarious and devastating."

References

External links

2012 films
American independent films
2012 drama films
American films based on plays
2012 independent films
2010s English-language films
2010s American films